Licenciado José Damián Villacorta Cañas (1796, Zacatecoluca, El Salvador – June 11, 1860, Nueva San Salvador) was a Salvadoran lawyer and politician. He was chief of state of El Salvador from February 16, 1830 to December 4, 1830, while it was a state within the Federal Republic of Central America.

His parents were Esteban Gabriel de Villacorta and María Ignacia de Cañas. He married Francisca de la Cotera. He obtained the degree of licenciado in civil law from the Universidad de San Carlos in Guatemala. He was also a well-known canon lawyer. He is considered one of the most illustrious figures in Salvadoran history.

He took part in the movement for independence from Spain, and was a deputy to the constituent congress of the State of El Salvador in 1824. He worked hard on the draft of the constitution, and for that is called the "Father of Salvadoran Institutions". He was secretary of the constituent congress, which on June 12, 1824 declared the first constitution of the Salvadoran state. Later Villacorta was named prosecutor before the state Supreme Court, councilor of state and vice-chief of state of El Salvador.

He served as chief executive of the state for a few months in 1830, both succeeding and preceding José María Cornejo. During his administration a legislative decree was issued abolishing the religious orders within the State of El Salvador (March 1830). Although the members of the orders were allowed to continue living in the monasteries and convents, the buildings were declared property of the state.

On December 4, 1830, he returned the executive authority to José María Cornejo.

For his opposition to what he saw as the interference of General Francisco Morazán in the internal affairs of El Salvador, he was arrested. Together with other Salvadoran authorities, he was taken in fetters to Guatemala in 1832.

In 1835 he was a deputy and interim president of the Legislature in Guatemala. In 1840 he refused the position of president of the Republic. He returned to El Salvador three years later.

For some time he served as law professor at the National University. Later he was elected vice-rector of the University and served as acting rector.

He was president of the Court of Justice in 1851 and 1858, and one of the founders of the city of Nueva San Salvador, after the disastrous earthquake of 1854 devastated the old city. In accordance with law, Villacorta established the Supreme Court in the new city in December 1856.

He died June 11, 1860 in New San Salvador.

External links
 Short biography from the Salvadoran government web site

1796 births
1860 deaths
Presidents of El Salvador
19th-century Salvadoran lawyers
People from La Paz Department (El Salvador)
Salvadoran people of Spanish descent
Universidad de San Carlos de Guatemala alumni
Academic staff of University of El Salvador